Donna Marie Christian-Christensen, formerly Donna Christian-Green (born September 19, 1945), is an American physician and politician. She served as the 4th elected non-voting Delegate from the United States Virgin Islands's at-large district to the United States House of Representatives from 1997 until 2015.

Biography

Early life
Born Donna Christian in Teaneck, New Jersey, she is the daughter of a Virgin Islands Federal District Court judge, Almeric Christian. She received her Bachelor of Science from St. Mary's College in Notre Dame, Indiana in 1966.  Christensen then attended the George Washington University School of Medicine in Washington, D.C., where she received an M.D. in 1970. She interned at San Francisco's Pacific Medical Center from 1970 to 1971 and performed her residency in family medicine at Howard University Medical Center from 1973 to 1974.

Career
Donna Christian-Christensen worked as a physician, first in the emergency room and later in the maternity ward. She then served as medical director for the St. Croix Hospital in St. Croix, Virgin Islands. She was the Acting Commissioner of Health for the Virgin Islands in 1993 and 1994 and also ran a private medical practice until 1996.

Christian was a delegate to the Democratic National Conventions from 1994 through 2012 elections. She has also previously served on the Status Commission and the Board of Education for the USVI.

She was also active in community organizations in the Virgin Islands, working to protect St. Croix from overdevelopment, and leading an effort to improve the quality of local judicial appointments.

U.S. House of Representatives
Donna Christian-Christensen ran unsuccessfully for the position of USVI delegate in 1994, losing in the primary to former judge Eileen Petersen. She won a three-way race beating Victor Frazer, an Independent. That race also included future Governor Kenneth Mapp, who would defeat Christensen in 2014 during the Governor race. However, she was elected as a Democrat to the House in a 1996 runoff with Frazer and served from January 3, 1997, to January 3, 2015.

Christian-Christensen has supported Obama's Patient Protection and Affordable Care Act. Shortly before the Supreme Court affirmed the legislation, she said "For 99 years, presidents have been trying to do this. Finally, our president has made it possible for each and every American."

Donna Christian-Christensen is a member of the Congressional Black Caucus and the Congressional Progressive Caucus. She was featured on The Colbert Report's Better Know a Protectorate segment. She is also the first female physician to win a congressional election.

Elections
2008

During the  2008 electoral campaign, she appeared in a TV advertisement endorsing the reelection of neighboring Puerto Rico Governor Aníbal Acevedo Vilá, who went to trial after the November 2008 elections for a twenty-four-count federal Grand Jury indictment for corruption. The jury found him not guilty, though he did lose his bid for re-election.

2010

Christian-Christensen won her 2010 reelection campaign with 71.22% of the vote.

2012

Christian-Christensen received substantial donations, at least $37,000 dollars, for her re-election from sources that are connected to Jeffrey Thompson, the chartered health services chairman.  However, since he had recently come under fire for a scandal, this money may have been considered to be "pecunia non grata" (unwanted money). Soon after, Thompson's firm was awarded a $6.3 million government contract in the Virgin Islands, Christensen's home district. Nonetheless, Christian-Christensen won her 2012 re-election bid with 60.05% of the vote.

2014

Christian-Christensen did not seek re-election to her congressional seat. Instead, she ran for Governor of the United States Virgin Islands, ultimately losing to Kenneth Mapp in a runoff.

Committee assignments
Committee on Energy and Commerce
Subcommittee on Communications and Technology
Subcommittee on Oversight and Investigations

Caucus memberships
Congressional Black Caucus
Congressional Caucus on Women's Issues
Congressional Progressive Caucus
Congressional Travel and Tourism Caucus
International Conservation Caucus
Congressional Arts Caucus

Honors and recognitions
On March 23, 2009, Delegate Christensen became the Ship Sponsor of the USCGC Reef Shark  during the vessel's commissioning ceremony in San Juan, Puerto Rico. The Reef Shark is a new 87' cutter, built at an approximate cost of $7.5 million by Bollinger Shipyards in Lockport, Louisiana.

See also
List of African-American United States representatives
Physicians in the United States Congress
Women in the United States House of Representatives

References

External links

|-

|-

1945 births
21st-century American politicians
21st-century American women politicians
African-American members of the United States House of Representatives
African-American women in politics
American people of the Moravian Church
Delegates to the United States House of Representatives from the United States Virgin Islands
Democratic Party members of the United States House of Representatives from the United States Virgin Islands
Democratic Party of the Virgin Islands politicians
Female members of the United States House of Representatives
George Washington University School of Medicine & Health Sciences alumni
Living people
Physicians from the United States Virgin Islands
People from Teaneck, New Jersey
Saint Mary's College (Indiana) alumni
United States Virgin Islands people of the Moravian Church
United States Virgin Islands women in politics
American people of United States Virgin Islands descent
African-American women physicians
African-American physicians
20th-century American women physicians
20th-century American physicians
21st-century American women physicians
21st-century American physicians